Józef Gąsienica Sobczak (born 9 July 1934) is a Polish skier. He competed at the 1956, 1960, 1964 and the 1968 Winter Olympics.

References

External links
 

1934 births
Living people
Polish male biathletes
Polish male cross-country skiers
Olympic biathletes of Poland
Olympic cross-country skiers of Poland
Biathletes at the 1964 Winter Olympics
Biathletes at the 1968 Winter Olympics
Cross-country skiers at the 1956 Winter Olympics
Cross-country skiers at the 1960 Winter Olympics
People from Tatra County